Brooke is a surname. Notable people with the surname include:

 Alan Brooke, 1st Viscount Alanbrooke (1883–1963), British Chief of the Imperial General Staff in WW 2
 Arthur Brooke (poet) (died 1563), English poet 
 Arthur Brooke (lieutenant-general) (1772–1843), British general
 Arthur de Capell Brooke (1791–1858), British baronet and travel writer
 Arthur Brooke (entrepreneur) (1845–1918), founder of Brooke Bond tea company
 Basil Stanlake Brooke (1888–1973), Irish Unionist politician
 Bryan Nicholson Brooke (1915–1998), English surgeon
 Charles Brooke (Jesuit) (1777–1852), English Jesuit
 Charles Brooke (surgeon) (1804–1879), English surgeon and inventor
 Charles Anthoni Johnson Brooke (1829–1917), Second Rajah of Sarawak
 Charles Vyner Brooke (1874–1963), Third and last Rajah of Sarawak
 Charlotte Brooke (writer), (c.1740–1793), Irish author, youngest daughter of Henry Brooke
 Christopher Brooke, English lawyer and author, MP from the City of York
 Christopher Nugent Lawrence Brooke (1927–2015), British medieval historian
 Edward Brooke (1919–2015), American politician
 Elizabeth Brooke, Lady Wyatt, alleged mistress of Henry VIII and estranged wife of the poet Thomas Wyatt
 Elisabeth Brooke, Marchioness of Northampton (died 1565), leading lady at the court of Edward VI and Elizabeth I of England
 Elizabeth Brooke (writer) (1601–1683), English religious writer
 Emily Brooke (born 1985), British inventor
 Frances Brooke (1724–1789), English novelist, essayist, playwright and translator
 Frederick H. Brooke (1876–1960), American architect from Washington, D.C.
 George Brooke (conspirator) (1568–1603), executed for his part in two plots against the government of King James I
 Graeme Brooke (born 1963), Australian boxer of the 1980s 
 Gustavus Vaughan Brooke (1818–1866), Irish stage actor, active in Ireland, England and Australia
 Gwydion Brooke (1912–2005), British bassoonist
 Heather Brooke (born 1970), American journalist
 Henry Brooke (disambiguation)
 Humphrey Brooke (physician) (1617-1693), British doctor
 Humphrey Brooke (art historian) (1914-1988), British art historian
 Iris Brooke (1905–post 1967), English artist and author
 James Brooke (1803–1868), First Rajah of Sarawak
 James Brooke (born 1955), American journalist
 Jocelyn Brooke (Jocelyn Bernard Brooke), writer
 Sir John Arthur Brooke, 1st Baronet of the Brooke Baronetcy of Almondbury (1844–1920)
 John Charles Brooke (1748–1794), FSA, Somerset Herald
 John Weston Brooke (1880–1908), English Officer in the Boer War, son of John Arthur Brooke
 Jonatha Brooke (born 1964), American folk-rock singer-songwriter
 John Mercer Brooke (1826–1906), scientist; USN & CSN
 Peter Brooke, Baron Brooke of Sutton Mandeville (born 1934), British politician and son of Henry Brooke
 Peter Brooke (17th-century MP), English politician
 Peter Brooke (businessman) (1929–2020), American businessman
 Ralph Brooke (1553–1625), English Officer of Arms in the reigns of Elizabeth I and James I
 Richard Kendall Brooke (1930–1996), a South African ornithologist
 Sir Robert Weston Brooke, 2nd Baronet of the Brooke Baronetcy of Almondbury (1885–1942)
 Rupert Brooke (1887–1915), poet
 Samuel Brooke (died 1632?), Master of Trinity College, Cambridge
 Stopford Brooke (chaplain) (1832–1916), Irish churchman and writer
 Stopford Brooke (politician) (1859–1938), British Member of Parliament from 1906 to 1910
 Sylvia Brett (1885–1917), Lady Brooke, Ranee of Sarawak
 Cecil Brooke-Short (1897–1934), English cricketer
 Tim Brooke-Taylor (born 1940), English actor
 Zachary Brooke (theologian) (1716–1788), English clergyman and academic
 Zachary Nugent Brooke, (1883–1946), British medieval historian and writer

See also
 Robert Brooke-Popham (1878–1953), Royal Air Force commander during the first half of the 20th century